Cape Sastrugi is a sharply projecting point on the west side of Deep Freeze Range, standing 1.5 nautical miles (2.8 km) northwest of Snowy Point and overlooking the north portion of Nansen Ice Sheet, in Victoria Land. First explored by the Northern Party of the British Antarctic Expedition, 1910–13, and so named by them because of large and extensive sastrugi that impeded the travel of this party in approaching the point.

Headlands of Victoria Land
Scott Coast